Chiayi City is represented in the Legislative Yuan since 2008 by one at-large single-member constituency (Chiayi Constituency).

Current district
 Chiayi City

Legislators

Election results

2020

2016

References 

Constituencies in Taiwan
Chiayi